Destruction Island (also known historically as Green Island) is a  island located approximately  off the Washington coast.  Home to seabirds, shorebirds, and marine mammals, it is part of the Quillayute Needles National Wildlife Refuge.

The Hoh Natives used to frequent Destruction Island to capture rhinoceros auklets. In recent years the population of rhinoceros auklet have been in decline as a result of habitat loss and eagle predation due to the presence of non-native European rabbits.

Destruction Island's name is derived from two massacres which happened nearby. In 1775, Spanish Navy lieutenant Juan Francisco de la Bodega y Quadra dispatched a crew of seven men to the mainland in order to gather wood and fresh water on the beach near Point Grenville, but they were attacked and killed by an estimated three hundred local Native Americans, leading him to name it the Isla de Dolores (the Island of Sorrows). Twelve years later, Captain Charles William Barkley, an independent English fur trader, arrived in the ship Imperial Eagle, and sent a party ashore from the island to a similar fate. Barkley named the river where the second massacre took place the Destruction River. Captain George Vancouver later transferred the name to the Isla de Dolores when the river was given its indigenous name, the Hoh River.

Three shipwrecks occurred at the island in 1889: Cassanora Adams, Port Gordon, and Wide West. The  Destruction Island Lighthouse was built on Destruction Island in 1888–91.  A US Coast Guard detachment operated the lighthouse from 1939 to the early 1970s.  The light was automated in 1968, before it was shut off for good in April 2008.  The island itself is accessible only by boat. The popular Ruby Beach is about 4 miles northeast on the coast. Both the island and the lighthouse are visible from the beach.

See also

References

Pacific islands of Washington (state)
Landforms of Jefferson County, Washington
Uninhabited islands of Washington (state)
Protected areas of Jefferson County, Washington